Lockhartia dipleura is a species of orchid native to Costa Rica.

References

dipleura
Endemic flora of Costa Rica